Hooman Darabi is an electrical engineer with Broadcom Corporation in Irvine, California. Darabi was named a Fellow of the Institute of Electrical and Electronics Engineers (IEEE) in 2014 for his contributions to radio frequency integrated circuits and systems. He received B.S. and M.S. degrees, both in electrical engineering, from Sharif University of Technology in Tehran, Iran, in 1994, and 1996, respectively. Darabi then received a Ph.D. in electrical engineering from the University of California, Los Angeles in 1999.

Darabi is currently a senior technical director and fellow with Broadcom, as well as an Adjunct Professor with the University of California, Los Angeles. His interests include analog and RF IC design for wireless communications. He also served as an IEEE distinguished lecturer from 2012 to 2014.

References

20th-century births
Living people
Fellow Members of the IEEE
Year of birth missing (living people)
Place of birth missing (living people)
American electrical engineers